Lookout Mountain is a census-designated place in Etowah County, Alabama, United States. Its population was 1,621 as of the 2010 census.

Demographics

References

Census-designated places in Etowah County, Alabama
Census-designated places in Alabama